Princess Antoinette, Baroness of Massy (Antoinette Louise Alberte Suzanne Grimaldi; 28 December 1920 – 18 March 2011) was a member of the princely family of Monaco. She was the elder sister of Prince Rainier III. Her parents were Count Pierre de Polignac and Charlotte, Hereditary Princess of Monaco and Duchess of Valentinois.

She was born in Paris, of French and Monegasque ancestry.

Children
Princess Antoinette had a long-term liaison with Alexandre-Athenase Noghès, a Monegasque-born attorney and international tennis champion, in the mid-1940s. The couple had three children born out-of-wedlock who were legitimated by their parents' eventual marriage and, henceforth, included in the line of succession to the Monegasque Throne until the death of Antoinette's brother, Prince Rainier III, in 2005; Elizabeth Ann de Massy (1947–2020), Christian Louis de Massy (born 1949), and Christine Alix de Massy (1951–1989).

Marriages
 Princess Antoinette and Alexandre-Athenase Noghès subsequently married at the Monaco consulate in Genoa on 4 December 1951 (her first, his second) and divorced in 1954.On 15 November 1951, Antoinette was created Baroness of Massy (Baronne de Massy). Her children (Elizabeth-Ann, Christian-Louis and Christine-Alix) were named Grimaldi at birth. They subsequently had their names changed to de Massy. He claims the title of Baron through their mother, but he is not entitled to it.
 She married her second husband, Dr. Jean-Charles Rey (Monaco, 22 October 1914 – Monaco, 17 September 1994), president of the Conseil National, the Parlement de Monaco in The Hague on 2 December 1961 and they divorced in 1974.
Her third and last husband was John Brian Gilpin (Southsea, Hampshire, 10 February 1930 – London, 5 September 1983), a British ballet dancer, whom she married in Monaco on 28 July 1983. He died suddenly six weeks later.

Life account
Having divorced Noghès, she and her lover Jean-Charles Rey hatched a plan to depose her brother Rainier III, Prince of Monaco, and declare herself regent on the basis of having a son who would one day inherit the throne. This led to the breakup of the relationship.

Rainier's marriage to Grace Kelly in 1956 and the arrival of his heirs, Princess Caroline in 1957 and Prince Albert in 1958, effectively scuttled Antoinette's plans. She was removed from the Palace by her sister-in-law, Princess Grace, and thereafter was estranged from the princely family for many years.

She was known to be somewhat eccentric and was described as "completely mad" by her servants. Having been banished from Monaco in the late 1950s, she lived down the coast from Monaco at Èze, with a large collection of dogs and cats. She was the president of Monaco's Society for the Protection of Animals and Refuge and a patron of the UK-based Battersea Dogs and Cats Home.

Upon the accession of Albert II in 2005, Antoinette and her descendants lost their place in the line of succession to the Monegasque throne, which is limited to the current sovereign's descendants, siblings, and siblings' descendants.

The Princess Antoinette Park in Monaco's La Condamine district was named in her honour.

Death
On 18 March 2011 Princess Antoinette died at The Princess Grace Hospital Centre, aged 90. Her funeral took place on 24 March 2011. She is buried in the Chapel of Peace in Monaco beside her parents, her daughters Elizabeth-Ann and Christine-Alix, her last husband John Brian Gilpin and her nephew by marriage, Stefano Casiraghi.

Patronages 
 President of the Society for the Protection of Animals and Refuge of Monaco.
 President of the Canine Society of Monaco.
 President of the “Monaco Interviews on Energy Medicines”, which became, the “Monaco International Interviews”.
 President of the Monegasque Tennis Federation. 
 President of the Monte Carlo Country Club.
 Vice-President of the Monegasque Red Cross.
 Patron of The Puppy and Kitten Clinic

Titles and honours
Titles
 28 December 1920 – 15 November 1951: Her Serene Highness Princess Antoinette of Monaco
 15 November 1951 – 18 March 2011: Her Serene Highness Princess Antoinette of Monaco, Baroness of Massy

Honours
 : Knight Grand Cross of the Order of Saint-Charles (28 December 1938)
 : Medal for Physical Education and Sports, First Class
 : Medal of Recognition of the Monegasque Red Cross

Ancestry

Bibliography
 Palace: My Life in the Royal Family of Monaco by Baron Christian de Massy & Charles Higham (1986, Atheneum)

References

Antoinette of Monaco, Princess
Antoinette of Monaco, Princess
Antoinette of Monaco
Antoinette of Monaco
Regents of Monaco
French baronesses
Monegasque people of Italian descent
Grand Crosses of the Order of Saint-Charles
Monegasque people of Mexican descent
Monegasque people of German descent
Monegasque people of English descent
Monegasque people of Scottish descent
Polignac family